The 1980 CFL season is considered to be the 27th season in modern-day Canadian football, although it is officially the 23rd Canadian Football League season.

CFL News in 1980
The Canadian Football League signed a three-year television contract with Carling O'Keefe Breweries for $15.6 million.

Regular season standings

Final regular season standings
Note: GP = Games Played, W = Wins, L = Losses, T = Ties, PF = Points For, PA = Points Against, Pts = Points

Bold text means that they have clinched the playoffs.
Edmonton and Hamilton have first round byes.

Grey Cup playoffs

The Edmonton Eskimos won their third-straight Grey Cup in 1980, defeating the Hamilton Tiger-Cats, 48–10, at Toronto's Exhibition Stadium. The Eskimos' Warren Moon (QB) was named the Grey Cup's Most Valuable Player on Offence and Dale Potter (LB) was named the Grey Cup's Most Valuable Player on Defence and the Grey Cup's Most Valuable Canadian.

Playoff bracket

CFL Leaders
 CFL Passing Leaders
 CFL Rushing Leaders
 CFL Receiving Leaders

1980 CFL All-Stars

Offence
QB – Dieter Brock, Winnipeg Blue Bombers
RB – James Sykes, Calgary Stampeders
RB – William Miller, Winnipeg Blue Bombers
SB – Tom Scott, Edmonton Eskimos
TE – Tony Gabriel, Ottawa Rough Riders
WR – Brian Kelly, Edmonton Eskimos
WR – Mike Holmes, Winnipeg Blue Bombers
C – Al Wilson, BC Lions
OG – Larry Butler, Winnipeg Blue Bombers
OG – Val Belcher, Ottawa Rough Riders
OT – Mike Wilson, Edmonton Eskimos
OT – Butch Norman, Winnipeg Blue Bombers

Defence
DT – Dave Fennell, Edmonton Eskimos
DT – Bruce Clark, Toronto Argonauts
DE – Ron Estay, Edmonton Eskimos
DE – Reggie Lewis, Calgary Stampeders
LB – Danny Kepley, Edmonton Eskimos
LB – Ben Zambiasi, Hamilton Tiger-Cats
LB – Dale Potter, Edmonton Eskimos
DB – Ray Odums, Calgary Stampeders
DB – Dickie Harris, Montreal Alouettes
DB – David Shaw, Hamilton Tiger-Cats
DB – Ed Jones, Edmonton Eskimos
DB – Gregg Butler, Edmonton Eskimos
DB – Ken McEachern, Saskatchewan Roughriders

Special teams
P – Hank Ilesic, Edmonton Eskimos
K – Bernie Ruoff, Hamilton Tiger-Cats

1980 Western All-Stars

Offence
QB – Dieter Brock, Winnipeg Blue Bombers
RB – James Sykes, Calgary Stampeders
RB – William Miller, Winnipeg Blue Bombers
SB – Tom Scott, Edmonton Eskimos
TE – Harry Holt, BC Lions
WR – Brian Kelly, Edmonton Eskimos
WR – Mike Holmes, Winnipeg Blue Bombers
C – Al Wilson, BC Lions
OG – Larry Butler, Winnipeg Blue Bombers
OG – Myke Horton, Calgary Stampeders
OT – Mike Wilson, Edmonton Eskimos
OT – Butch Norman, Winnipeg Blue Bombers

Defence
DT – Dave Fennell, Edmonton Eskimos
DT – Ed McAleney, Calgary Stampeders
DE – Ron Estay, Edmonton Eskimos
DE – Reggie Lewis, Calgary Stampeders
LB – Danny Kepley, Edmonton Eskimos
LB – Tom Towns, Edmonton Eskimos
LB – Dale Potter, Edmonton Eskimos
DB – Ray Odums, Calgary Stampeders
DB – Charles Williams, Winnipeg Blue Bombers
DB – Ed Jones, Edmonton Eskimos
DB – Greg Butler, Edmonton Eskimos
DB – Ken McEachern, Saskatchewan Roughriders

Special teams
P – Hank Ilesic, Edmonton Eskimos
K – Dave Cutler, Edmonton Eskimos
K – Lui Passaglia, BC Lions

1980 Eastern All-Stars

Offence
QB – Gerry Dattilio, Montreal Alouettes
RB – Richard Crump, Ottawa Rough Riders
RB – Alvin Walker, Montreal Alouettes
SB – Dave Newman, Toronto Argonauts
TE – Tony Gabriel, Ottawa Rough Riders
WR – Bob Gaddis, Toronto Argonauts
WR – Keith Baker, Montreal Alouettes
C – Henry Waszczuk, Hamilton Tiger-Cats
OG – Alan Moffat, Hamilton Tiger-Cats
OG – Val Belcher, Ottawa Rough Riders
OT – Doug Payton, Montreal Alouettes
OT – Willie Martin, Hamilton Tiger-Cats

Defence
DT – Mike Raines, Ottawa Rough Riders
DT – Bruce Clark, Toronto Argonauts
DE – Jim Corrigall, Toronto Argonauts
DE – Junior Ah You, Montreal Alouettes
LB – Ron Foxx, Ottawa Rough Riders
LB – Ben Zambiasi, Hamilton Tiger-Cats
LB – Rick Sowieta, Ottawa Rough Riders
LB – Tom Cousineau, Montreal Alouettes
DB – Dickie Harris, Montreal Alouettes
DB – David Shaw, Hamilton Tiger-Cats
DB – Jerry Anderson, Hamilton Tiger-Cats
DB – Harold Woods, Hamilton Tiger-Cats
DB – Billy Hardee, Toronto Argonauts

Special teams
P – Zenon Andrusyshyn, Toronto Argonauts
K – Bernie Ruoff, Hamilton Tiger-Cats

1980 CFL Awards
CFL's Most Outstanding Player Award – Dieter Brock (QB), Winnipeg Blue Bombers
CFL's Most Outstanding Canadian Award – Gerry Dattilio (QB), Montreal Alouettes
CFL's Most Outstanding Defensive Player Award – Danny Kepley (LB), Edmonton Eskimos
CFL's Most Outstanding Offensive Lineman Award – Mike Wilson (OT), Edmonton Eskimos
CFL's Most Outstanding Rookie Award – William Miller (RB), Winnipeg Blue Bombers
CFLPA's Outstanding Community Service Award – Jim Coode (OT), Ottawa Rough Riders
CFL's Coach of the Year – Ray Jauch, Winnipeg Blue Bombers

References 

CFL
Canadian Football League seasons